Hamju County is a county in South Hamgyong province, North Korea.

Physical features
The county's highest point is Norabong.  The chief river is the Sangch'ŏn River (상천강).  Aside from the coastal area, Hamju is mountainous throughout. It is cold, but is distinguished by the occurrence of foehn winds in the upland areas. Due to this, the climate is milder than the Yellow Sea coastal regions.

Administrative divisions
Hamju county is divided into 1 ŭp (town) and 36 ri (villages):

Economy

Agriculture and fishery
In the level regions, a large amount of rice is produced. Most agriculture in the county is dry-field farming, with crops including Deccan millet, red beans, soybeans, potatoes, and vegetables. Silkworms and livestock are also widely raised, and fishing is carried out along the coast.

Mining
Mining also takes place, with deposits of iron ore, cuprite, and other minerals.

Transport
Hamju county is served by the P'yŏngra and Kŭmgol lines of the Korean State Railway, and by various roads.

See also
Administrative divisions of North Korea
Geography of North Korea

References

External links

Counties of South Hamgyong